B'z Live-Gym Pleasure 2008 -Glory Days- is the nineteenth live DVD released by Japanese rock duo B'z, on February 25, 2009.

Track listing
 BAD COMMUNICATION
 ultra soul
 Hadashi no Megami
 Blowin'
 Negai
 Konya Tsuki no Mieru Oka ni
 Mou Ichido Kiss Shitakatta
 KOI-GOKORO
 Kodoku no Runaway
 Don't Leave Me
 Ocean
 NATIVE DANCE
 Oh! Darling
 Dakara Sono Te wo Hanashite
 Itsuka Mata Kokode
 ONE
 Love Phantom
 Zero
 Juice
 Ai no Bakudan
 Banzai
 Brotherhood
 Giri Giri Chop
 Glory Days
 RUN
 Pleasure 2008 -Jinsei no Kairaku-

Certifications

Personnel 
Takahiro Matsumoto - producer, guitar
Koshi Inaba - vocalist

External links 
B'z Official Website 

B'z video albums
2009 video albums
Live video albums
2009 live albums